Pasqual Piñón (1889–1929), known as The Two-Headed Mexican, was a performer with the Sells-Floto Circus in the early 1900s. A railroad worker from Texas, Piñón was discovered by a sideshow promoter whose attention had been caught by a large benign cyst or tumor at the top of Piñón's head. The promoter drafted Piñón into his freak show and had a fake face made of wax to place onto the growth, allowing the claim that Piñón had two heads. Some reports state that it was made of silver and surgically placed under the skin. After several years of touring, the circus manager paid to have the growth removed, and Piñón returned to Texas.

While it is possible for a person to have two heads, the condition craniopagus parasiticus, a form of conjoined twins, sees one head upside-down on top of the other – Piñón's "second head" was oriented like his actual head.

The novels Downfall and The Book about Blanche and Marie by Per Olov Enquist feature Piñón, though they portray the story as factual and, in the former book, make the second head female.

The short fictional story My Pet Trilobite by Kristin Harley, published in Ricky's Back Yard – Cult issue (vol. 1, no. 1), features Piñón, narrated by the other head who is in physical and political conflict with him.

See also 
 Edward Mordake

References

Sideshow performers
1889 births
1929 deaths